The 2011 ICC European Twenty20 Championship Division Three is a cricket tournament that took place between 11 and 14 May 2011. It forms part of the European Cricket Championship. Slovenia and Austria hosted the event.

Teams
Teams that qualified are as follows:

Squads

Fixtures

Group stage

Points Table

Matches

Statistics

Highest team totals
The following table lists the six highest team scores.

Most runs
The top five highest run scorers (total runs) are included in this table.

Highest scores
This table contains the top five highest scores made by a batsman in a single innings.

Most wickets
The following table contains the five leading wicket-takers.

Best bowling figures
This table lists the top five players with the best bowling figures.

See also

2012 ICC World Twenty20 Qualifier
European Cricket Championship

References

2012 ICC World Twenty20
European Cricket Championship
2011 in Austrian sport
2011 in Slovenian sport
International cricket competitions in Austria
International cricket competitions in Slovenia